Second Heaven is a novel written by Judith Guest, published in 1983.

External links
Review at the New York Times
Second Heaven at the author's website

1983 American novels
Novels set in Michigan
Viking Press books